Guadeloupe, an overseas region and department of France located in the Caribbean, has no flag with official status other than the French national flag.

Other flags
The French tricolore is the official national flag used in Guadeloupe.

In addition to the French flag, an inscribed regional logo on a white field is often used as regional flag, similar to the practice in Mayotte and Réunion. The logo of Guadeloupe shows a stylized Sun and bird on a green and light blue square with the subscript REGION GUADELOUPE underlined in yellow.

A locally used unofficial flag, based on the coat of arms of Guadeloupe's capital Basse-Terre has a black or red field with a 30-rayed yellow sun and a green sugarcane, and a blue stripe with three yellow fleurs-de-lis on the top.

The independentist People's Union for the Liberation of Guadeloupe has proposed a national flag very similar to that of Suriname.

Gallery

See also
 Coat of arms of Guadeloupe
 Flags of the regions of France
 List of political parties in Guadeloupe

References

External links

 
 

Flags of Overseas France
Flag